Esmeralda is a rural locality in the Shire of Croydon, Queensland, Australia.

History 
The locality takes its name from a local hill named on 30 September 1873 by explorer George Elphinstone Dalrymple.

Road infrastructure
The Richmond–Croydon Road runs through from south to north.

References 

Shire of Croydon
Localities in Queensland